was a Japanese entomologist specialized in Lepidoptera.

List of publications
Shibuya, J., 1927a. A study on the Japanese Epipaschiinae. Trans. Nat. Hist. Soc. Formosa 17 :339-359.
Shibuya, J., 1927b. Some New and Unrecordes Species of Pyralidae from Corea (Lepid.). Insecta Matsumurana Sapporo, 2: 87-102
Shibuya, J. 1928a. Descriptions of one new genus and one new species, with four unrecorded species of Phycitinae from Japan (Lepid.). – Insecta Matsumurana, Sapporo 2 (3): 121–124.
Shibuya, J., 1928b. On the Japanese Crambinae (Lepid.). The systematic study on the Japanese Pyralinae (Lepid.). Journal of the Faculty of Agriculture, Hokkaido Imperial University = 北海道帝國大學農學部紀要. 21(4): 121-147
Shibuya, J., 1928c. The Systematic Study on the Japanese Pyralinae (Lepid.). Journal of the Faculty of Agriculture, Hokkaido Imperial University = 北海道帝國大學農學部紀要. Vol.21(4): 149-176
Shibuya, J., 1928d. The systematic study on the Formosan Pyralidae. Jour.Facul.Agr., Hokkaido Imp.Univ. Vol.22:1–300
Shibuya, J. 1929a: On the Pyralidae from the Bonin islands. – Insecta Matsumurana, Sapporo 3 (2–3): 111–114.
Shibuya, J. 1929b. On the Japanese Hydrocampinae. - Insecta Matsumurana, N.S. 3(2–3):120–136
Shibuya, J., 1929c. On the known and unrecorded species of the Japanese Pyranstinae (Lepid.). Journal of the Faculty of Agriculture, Hokkaido Imperial University = 北海道帝國大學農學部紀要. 25(3), 1929, 151-242
Shibuya, J., 1929d. The Galleriinae of Japan (Lepid.). - Insecta Matsumurana. 4(1-2), 1929, 17-24
Shibuya, J., 1931. The Endotrichinae of Japan. - Insecta Matsumurana. 5(4): 161-170

References

External links
 www.nhm.ac.uk - National History Museum: Bibliographic record on Jinshichi Shibuya

Japanese entomologists
Japanese lepidopterists
Year of death missing
Year of birth missing